Hansung University Station (Korean:한성대입구역) is a station on the Seoul Subway Line 4. Its station subname is Samseongyo. The university with the same name is about a half-mile away from this station. The Holy Spirit Campus of the Catholic University of Korea is located closer, to the southwest.

Station layout

References 

Seoul Metropolitan Subway stations
Metro stations in Seongbuk District
Railway stations in South Korea opened in 1985